Macedonia (officially under the provisional appellation "former Yugoslav Republic of Macedonia", abbreviated "FYR Macedonia") participated in the Eurovision Song Contest 2015 with the song "Autumn Leaves" written by Joacim Persson and Robert Bilbilov. The song was performed by Daniel Kajmakoski. The Macedonian broadcaster Macedonian Radio Television (MRT) organised Skopje Fest 2014 in order to select the Macedonian entry for the 2015 contest in Vienna, Austria. Twenty entries competed in the competition on 12 November 2014 where "Lisja esenski" performed by Daniel Kajmakoski was selected following the combination of votes from seven international jury groups and a public televote. The song was later translated from Macedonian to English for the Eurovision Song Contest and was titled "Autumn Leaves".

Macedonia was drawn to compete in the first semi-final of the Eurovision Song Contest which took place on 19 May 2015. Performing during the show in position 8, "Autumn Leaves" was not announced among the top 10 entries of the first semi-final and therefore did not qualify to compete in the final. It was later revealed that Macedonia placed fifteenth out of the 16 participating countries in the semi-final with 28 points.

Background

The nation's best result in the contest to this point was twelfth, which it achieved in 2006 with the song "Ninanajna" performed by Elena Risteska.

The Macedonian national broadcaster, Macedonian Radio Television (MRT), broadcasts the event within Macedonia and organises the selection process for the nation's entry. Macedonia had previously selected their entry for the Eurovision Song Contest through both national finals and internal selections. In June 2014, MRT held a survey on their website asking for advice regarding Macedonia's future participation in the Eurovision Song Contest. Despite the option for withdrawal attracting the majority of the vote, MRT confirmed their intentions to participate at the 2015 Eurovision Song Contest on 15 July 2014 and announced that Skopje Fest would return to select the Macedonian entry.

Before Eurovision

Skopje Fest 2014 

Skopje Fest 2014 was a song contest organised by MRT that served as Macedonia's national final to select their entry for the Eurovision Song Contest 2014. Twenty entries participated in the competition which took place on 12 November 2014 at the Metropolis Arena in Skopje, hosted by Vasil Zafircev and was broadcast on MRT 1, MRT Sat and online via the broadcaster's official website mrt.com.mk.

Competing entries 
A submission period was opened for interested artists and composers to submit their songs between 26 May 2014 and 31 July 2014. MRT received over 180 submissions at the closing of the deadline. Thirteen entries were selected from the open submissions, while an additional seven entries were submitted by well-known composers directly invited by MRT for the competition. The twenty competing artists and songs were announced on 26 September 2014 during the MRT 1 programme Stisni Plej. 

Among the competing artists were former Macedonian Eurovision Song Contest entrants: Tamara Todevska who represented Macedonia in 2008 and Vlatko Ilievski who represented Macedonia in 2011. Viktorija Loba represented Macedonia at the Junior Eurovision Song Contest 2003. Among the competing composers were Grigor Koprov, Jovan Jovanov, Lazar Cvetkoski, Magdalena Cvetkoska, Vlado Janevski and Vladimir Dojčinovski who co-wrote several Eurovision entries. Vlado Janevski also represented Macedonia at the Eurovision Song Contest 1998. On 28 October 2014, MRT announced that Nina Janeva would replace Sašo Gigov-Giš as the performer of the song "Bluz za...".

Final 
The final took place on 12 November 2014. The running order was announced on 31 October 2014. All twenty competing entries were accompanied by the MRT orchestra, conducted by Ljupčo Mirkovski, and a 50/50 combination of public televoting and seven international jury groups selected "Lisja esenski" performed by Daniel Kajmakoski as the winner. Monetary prizes were also awarded to the top three songs: the winner received €20,000, the second place received €10,000 and the third place received €5,000. In addition to the performances of the competing entries, the competition featured guest performances by 2002 and 2007 Macedonian Eurovision representative Karolina Gočeva and 2012 Macedonian Eurovision representative Kaliopi.

Controversy 
It was revealed a day after Skopje Fest 2014 that over 2,500 phone cards were seized by the Macedonian police which were investigating a possible voting fraud where 14 people were identified to have been hired to use the previously distributed cards during the voting of the competition. It was later claimed that composer of Viktorija Loba's song, Jovan Jovanov, was part of the four-member group responsible for the case.

Preparation
Following Skopje Fest 2014, Daniel Kajmakoski stated in an interview with ESCplus that he was highly considering to perform "Lisja esenski" in English at the Eurovision Song Contest. It was later confirmed that the song would be performed in English as "Autumn Leaves" and that a new three-minute version was recorded in early 2015. Kajmakovski worked with Macedonian producer Robert Bilbilov to create the final English version of the song, which was presented to the public through the release of the official music video via the official Eurovision Song Contest's YouTube channel.

Promotion 
Daniel Kajmakoski made several appearances across Europe to specifically promote "Autumn Leaves" as the Macedonian Eurovision entry. On 1 February, Kajmakoski performed the Macedonian and Serbian versions of "Autumn Leaves" during the RTS1 programme Nedeljno popodne in Serbia. On 13 April, Kajmakoski took part in promotional activies in Tirana, Albania where he gave interviews for media outlets and appeared during talk show programmes to discuss his Eurovision participation. On 15 April, Kajmakoski performed during a preview event which was organised by OGAE Serbia and held at the UŠĆE Shopping Centre in Belgrade, Serbia. On 18 April, Kajmakoski performed during the Eurovision in Concert event which was held at the Melkweg venue in Amsterdam, Netherlands and hosted by Cornald Maas and Edsilia Rombley. On 24 April, Kajmakoski performed during the Eurovision Pre-Party, which was held at the Place de Paris Korston Concert Hall in Moscow, Russia. A farewell event was held in Skopje on 9 May before Daniel Kajmakoski departed to Vienna for the contest.

At Eurovision 

According to Eurovision rules, all nations with the exceptions of the host country and the "Big Five" (France, Germany, Italy, Spain and the United Kingdom) are required to qualify from one of two semi-finals in order to compete for the final; the top ten countries from each semi-final progress to the final. In the 2015 contest, Australia also competed directly in the final as an invited guest nation. The European Broadcasting Union (EBU) split up the competing countries into five different pots based on voting patterns from previous contests, with countries with favourable voting histories put into the same pot. On 26 January 2015, a special allocation draw was held which placed each country into one of the two semi-finals, as well as which half of the show they would perform in. Macedonia was placed into the first semi-final, to be held on 19 May 2015, and was scheduled to perform in the first half of the show.

Once all the competing songs for the 2015 contest had been released, the running order for the semi-finals was decided by the shows' producers rather than through another draw, so that similar songs were not placed next to each other. Macedonia was set to perform in position 8, following the entry from Estonia and before the entry from Serbia.

The two semi-finals and final were broadcast in Macedonia on MRT 1, MRT Sat and Radio Skopje with commentary by Karolina Petkovska. MRT also broadcast the three shows on MRT 2 and MRT 2 Sat with commentary in the Albanian language. The Macedonian spokesperson, who announced the Macedonian votes during the final, was Marko Mark.

Semi-final

Daniel Kajmakoski took part in technical rehearsals on 11 and 15 May, followed by dress rehearsals on 18 and 19 May. This included the jury show on 11 May where the professional juries of each country watched and voted on the competing entries.

The Macedonian performance featured Daniel Kajmakoski performing choreographed movements in a trench coat together with three backing vocalists in black trench coats. The stage colours were gold, red and dark blue with the background LED screens displaying medieval ruins, flowing autumn leaves and a sky that transitioned from grey to yellow and red colours. The three backing vocalists that joined Daniel Kajmakoski on stage were members of the American R&B group Blackstreet (MERJ): Mark Middleton, Eric Williams and Jeremy Hanna.

At the end of the show, Macedonia was not announced among the top 10 entries in the first semi-final and therefore failed to qualify to compete in the final. It was later revealed that Macedonia placed fifteenth in the semi-final, receiving a total of 28 points.

Voting
Voting during the three shows consisted of 50 percent public televoting and 50 percent from a jury deliberation. The jury consisted of five music industry professionals who were citizens of the country they represent, with their names published before the contest to ensure transparency. This jury was asked to judge each contestant based on: vocal capacity; the stage performance; the song's composition and originality; and the overall impression by the act. In addition, no member of a national jury could be related in any way to any of the competing acts in such a way that they cannot vote impartially and independently. The individual rankings of each jury member were released shortly after the grand final.

Following the release of the full split voting by the EBU after the conclusion of the competition, it was revealed that Macedonia had placed sixteenth (last) with the public televote and fifteenth with the jury vote in the first semi-final. In the public vote, Macedonia scored 22 points, while in the jury vote, Macedonia scored 42 points. In addition, the EBU announced that it had disqualified the Macedonian jury results in the final due to irregularities. The exclusion of the votes was decided upon in consultation with the contest's independent voting observer, PricewaterhouseCoopers, and based upon the decision of the Executive Supervisor and the Chairman of the Reference Group. Macedonia's votes in the final were produced solely by the public televote.

Below is a breakdown of points awarded to Macedonia and awarded by Macedonia in the first semi-final and grand final of the contest, and the breakdown of the jury voting and televoting conducted during the two shows:

Points awarded to Macedonia

Points awarded by Macedonia

Detailed voting results
The following members comprised the Macedonian jury:
 Antonio Dimitrievski (jury chairperson)music producer
 Ana Kostadinovskamusic teacher, backing vocal
 singer
 Sara Nikolovskaprofessional musician
 Andrijana Jovanovskalyric writer, music journalist

References 

2015
Countries in the Eurovision Song Contest 2015
Eurovision